SIOP may refer to:

International Society of Paediatric Oncology
Sales Inventory Operations Planning, an integrated business management process
Sheltered Instruction Observation Protocol, a research-based observation instrument used to measure sheltered instruction
Single Integrated Operational Plan, the tactical blueprint for the deployment of nuclear weapons by the United States
Society for Industrial and Organizational Psychology, a division of the American Psychological Association for I/O psychologists
Steroid-induced osteoporosis, a bone disease that leads to an increased risk of fracture